The Northern Electric Railway—Marysville and Colusa Branch was incorporated on June 6, 1910, to construct a branch from a junction with Northern Electric's mainline near Yuba City (Colusa Junction) then west for 22.39 miles to Colusa.  The construction of the branch commenced in December 1911 and was completed on June 16, 1913.  The Northern Electric Railway–Marysville and Colusa Branch operated under lease to the Northern Electric Railway.  The Northern Electric Railway was an interurban line.

On June 30, 1918, the Northern Electric Railway was sold to the Sacramento Northern Railroad, which would later become the Sacramento Northern Railway.

Route
Colusa Junction (with Northern Electric's Chico-Sacramento mainline)
Sutter
Tarke
Meridian
Colusa

The track between Tarke and Colusa was abandoned prior to 1974.  The branch was later known as the Tarke Branch.  Abandonment of the Tarke Branch was applied for in the early 1980s by Sacramento Northern's parent, Western Pacific Railroad.  The track was eventually abandoned between Sutter and Tarke.  In 2007, Western Pacific's successor, the Union Pacific Railroad, abandoned the remainder of the branch west of Colusa Junction as part of the abandonment of all former SN lines in Yuba City.  Portions of the roadbed east of the grade crossing on Acacia Avenue in Sutter have been converted to a mixed-use bicycle/walking trail.

This should not be confused with the Colusa and Lake Railroad line which ran between Colusa and Colusa Junction, present day Lurline Av.  This Colusa Junction is west of Colusa at Old Highway 99 and Lurline Av.

See also
 Sacramento Northern Railway
 Dixon Branch

References

Sacramento Northern Railway
History of Colusa County, California
History of Yuba County, California
Colusa, California
Marysville, California
Transportation in Colusa County, California
Transportation in Yuba County, California
Railway companies established in 1910
Railway companies disestablished in 1918
1910 establishments in California
1918 disestablishments in California